Kurilovo is a rural locality (a settlement) in Shchapovskoye Settlement of Troitsky Administrative Okrug, Moscow, Russia. Population:

Geography 
The nearest settlements are the villages of Satino-Russkoye and Satino-Tatarskoye.

In Kurilovo, there is secondary school No. 2075 in Moscow.

References 

Rural localities in Moscow (federal city)